Less-than-truckload shipping or less than load (LTL) is the transportation of an amount of freight sized between individual parcels and full truckloads. Full truckload carriers move entire semi-trailers. The term LTL can refer to the freight itself, or to the carrier that transports the such freight.

LTL operations vs. FTL operations
Full truck load (FTL) carriers typically haul loads for one single shipper. In these cases, the shipper "rents" a trailer to transport their product where it needs to go, typically paying a "per mile rate" from the carrier. However, with LTL, a single trailer can carry several different shipper's shipments and since each shipment is technically "less than a truckload" they would consider that to be LTL.

Due to the basic differences between these two modes, there are freight carriers who either specialize in FTL or LTL. While these carriers can crossover and handle freight shipments from the other mode, typically they operate under one mode. Oftentimes an LTL carrier can be references as a "common" carrier, one who handles common freight above what would normally ship via FedEx Ground, or UPS or U.S. LTL common carriers are also more likely to accept loose (non-palletized) cargo than the other two modes, FTL and parcel.

Less than Truckload carriers use "hub and spoke" operations where linehauls/truck routes are the spokes, and service terminals for each carrier are the hubs (also called Distribution Centers or DC's). Terminals collect local freight from the various shippers they work with in an area and use the hub to consolidate the freight into regions or areas where those shipments are destined to be delivered. Because of the efficiency of this order of operations, most deliveries are performed in the morning and most pickups are made in the afternoon.

Pickup and delivery drivers usually have set casual routes which they travel every day or several times a week, so the driver has an opportunity to develop a rapport with their customers. Once the driver has filled their trailer or completed their assigned route, they return to their terminal for unloading. The trailer is unloaded and the individual shipments are then weighed and inspected to verify their conformity to the description contained in the accompanying paperwork. All LTL freight is subject to inspection ('S.T.I.'), though not all freight is inspected.

Transit times for LTL freight are longer than for full truckload freight (FTL). LTL transit times are not directly related only to the distance between shipper and consignee. Instead, LTL transit times are also dependent upon the makeup of the network of terminals and breakbulks that are operated by a given carrier and that carrier's beyond agents and interline partners. For example, if a shipment is picked up and delivered by the same freight terminal, or if the freight must be sorted and routed only once while in transit, the freight will likely be delivered on the next business day after pickup. If the freight must be sorted and routed more than once, or if more than one linehaul is required for transportation to the delivering terminal, then the transit time will be longer. In some instances, the LTL freight has up to 10 days of delivery time frame.

The main advantage to using an LTL carrier is that a shipment may be transported for a fraction of the cost of hiring an entire truck and trailer for an exclusive shipment. Also, a number of accessory services are available from LTL carriers, which are not typically offered by FTL carriers. These optional services include liftgate service at pickup or delivery, residential (also known as "non-commercial") service at pickup or delivery, inside delivery, notification prior to delivery, freeze protection, and others. These services are usually billed at a predetermined flat fee, or for a weight based surcharge calculated as a rate per pound or per hundredweight.

Integrating FTL and LTL carriers for shipper cost savings
Shippers with enough volume of LTL freight may choose to use a full truckload carrier to move the freight directly to a break-bulk facility of an LTL carrier. For example, a North Carolina shipper with a large quantity of shipments bound for Western US States (for example, California, Nevada, Oregon, Washington, and Idaho) may be able to realize significant cost savings by having a FTL carrier, known as a linehaul carrier, transport the freight to a break-bulk facility in a central location near the ultimate destination of the freight (in this example, delivery to a break-bulk facility in California for parceling out into LTL lots for transport to the final destinations). The use of an FTL carrier to transport this freight generally provides an overall cost savings because the freight will travel fewer miles in the FTL carrier's network, as well as a reduced overall fuel surcharge cost—that is, one FTL carrier travels the distance to the break-bulk facility for a single carrier's price while using only the fuel required for that FTL truck, vs. several LTL carriers at each carrier's price, each covering some of the same path to the final destinations and each using the fuel required for each one of the LTL trucks. A further benefit is realized in both loading cost and product damage, because the freight will not need to be unloaded and reloaded as many times.  Additionally, this reduces the incidence of loss and the opportunity for pilfering or theft, because all of the freight travels together and is not broken down into LTL loads until it reaches the break-bulk distribution facility.

LTL operations versus parcel carrier operations

Parcel carrier operations
Parcel carriers typically compete with LTL carriers by convincing shippers to break larger shipments down to smaller packages. The hundredweight rate is multiplied by the shipment's weight and then divided by 100 and then rounded up to the nearest hundred.

LTL carrier operation
LTL carriers prefer to handle shipments with the fewest handling units possible. LTL carriers prefer a shipment of one pallet containing many boxes shrink wrapped to form one piece rather than many individual pieces. This reduces handling costs and the risk of damage during transit. Typically, the per-pound rates of LTL carriers are less than the per-pound rates of parcel carriers.

Preparing shipments for LTL carriers
Freight sent via LTL carriers must be handled several times during transit, often by different carriers. It must be packaged to protect it from scuffing, vibration, crushing, dropping, humidity, condensation. Thus, it is normally good practice to load freight onto pallets or package freight into crates. Sturdy shipping containers such as corrugated fiberboard boxes are normally acceptable as well, but pallets are preferred. Carriers have published tariffs that provide some guidance for packaging. Packaging engineers design and test packaging to meet the specific needs of the logistics system and the product being shipped.

Proper packaging freight serves several purposes:
 It helps protect the freight from handling and transit damage.
 It helps protect freight from being damaged by shipper's freight.
 It helps reduce package pilferage
 It helps to avoid loss situations; situations in which some of customer's freight is separated from the rest and lost in transit.

Other considerations:
 Type of shipment: pallet, drum, crate, skid, bags, rolls, reels, bales or other.
 Size: height width depth.
 Weight, each piece and total.
 Insurance value coverage, if any.
 Liftgate service requirements, if any
 Find the correct National Motor Freight Classification code.
 Arrival notice, if any
 Hazardous-materials notice, if any 
 Residential delivery notice.

Intermodal transportation of LTL shipping 
Not all LTL shipments travel by truck only. LTL carriers rely on rail or air to forward some freight toward its destination. LTL carriers are normally able to deal with railroads more effectively than small shippers since LTL carriers typically send a large volume of freight daily. For example, a significant portion of rail intermodal traffic consists of truck trailers, often dozens in a single intermodal train, carrying LTL freight. LTL carriers are able to monitor railroad performance to ensure delivery of freight within the specified delivery window. An intermodal freight transport shipment employs several methods of transporting goods from start to finish. For instance, one shipment will start out on the railroad, then be transferred to an ocean carrier, and end up on a truck before delivery.

Intermodal shipping is considered advantageous by some shippers because there is no handling of the freight when it changes from one carrier to the next.  Pallets are used to consolidate many items into one easy-to-move container. Because handling is reduced, it also reduces damage and loss, increases security, and allows quicker transport.

See also 
 Corrugated box design
 Dimensional weight for cube factor
 Track and trace
 Unit load

References

Freight transport
Trucking industry in the United States